Grzegorz Głowania is a Polish former competitive figure skater. He is the 1980 Blue Swords champion, the 1983 Winter Universiade bronze medalist, and a four-time Polish national champion.

Głowania competed at four European Championships and one World Championship. His skating club was KKŁ Katowice.

Competitive highlights

References 

Polish male single skaters
Living people
Sportspeople from Katowice
Universiade medalists in figure skating
Year of birth missing (living people)
Universiade bronze medalists for Poland
Competitors at the 1981 Winter Universiade
Competitors at the 1983 Winter Universiade